Aswapuram or Ashwapuram is a Mandal in Bhadradri Kothagudem district,  Telangana State, India.

Institutions
 Aswapuram Omsakthi Amma Kalyana Mandapam 
 Aswapuram Omsakthi Amma Karuna Nilayam 
 Atomic Energy Central School
 Atomic Energy Junior College
 State Bank of India
 Govt junior college
 Sri Vidhya Junior College

Villages
The villages in Aswapuram mandal include:
 Amerda 	
 Ammagaripalli 	
 Anandapuram 	
 Aswapuram 	
 Chintriyala 	
 Gollagudem 	
 Gondigudem 	
 Jaggaram
 Mallelamadugu (Raja Rao Nagar) 	
 Mittagudem 	
 Mondikunta 	
 Nellipaka banjara	
 Thummalacheruvu 
 Gopalapuram
 Seetharampuram (Muthareddygudem)

References

Mandals in Bhadradri Kothagudem district